Trichotichnus is a genus of beetles in the family Carabidae.

Species

 Trichotichnus abei Morita, 1997
 Trichotichnus abnormis N.Ito, 2000
 Trichotichnus acuticollis N.Ito, 2001
 Trichotichnus akitai N.Ito, 2009
 Trichotichnus allorensis (Schauberger, 1935)
 Trichotichnus alpinus Morita, 1997
 Trichotichnus altus Darlington, 1968
 Trichotichnus amagisanus N.Ito, 2005
 Trichotichnus amazeus (Clarke, 1971)
 Trichotichnus andoi N.Ito, 2014
 Trichotichnus angustatostriatus N.Ito, 1999
 Trichotichnus anisodactyloides N.Ito, 2000
 Trichotichnus anthracinus Landin, 1955
 Trichotichnus aquilo Andrewes, 1930
 Trichotichnus arcipennis N.Ito, 2014
 Trichotichnus arcuatomarginatus N.Ito, 2000
 Trichotichnus armiger Morita, 1997
 Trichotichnus asper Morita, 1997
 Trichotichnus assamensis (Schauberger, 1935)
 Trichotichnus autumnalis (Say, 1823)
 Trichotichnus baehri N.Ito, 1997
 Trichotichnus baglungensis Kataev & J.Schmidt, 2017
 Trichotichnus batesi Csiki, 1932
 Trichotichnus bicolor (Tschitscherine, 1906)
 Trichotichnus birmanicus Bates, 1892
 Trichotichnus bousqueti N.Ito, 1998
 Trichotichnus bouvieri (Tschitscherine, 1897)
 Trichotichnus brancuccii Kataev & J.Schmidt, 2017
 Trichotichnus brandti Darlington, 1968
 Trichotichnus brevicollis N.Ito, 1998
 Trichotichnus brunneiventralis N.Ito, 1999
 Trichotichnus brunneomarginatus N.Ito, 1998
 Trichotichnus brunneus N.Ito, 1998
 Trichotichnus bubsaensis Kataev & J.Schmidt, 2017
 Trichotichnus calathiformis N.Ito, 1999
 Trichotichnus celebensis (Schauberger, 1933)
 Trichotichnus chinensis (Fairmaire, 1886)
 Trichotichnus choukaisanus N.Ito, 2005
 Trichotichnus chugokuensis N.Ito, 1996
 Trichotichnus chuji Jedlicka, 1949
 Trichotichnus circumtinctus (Andrewes, 1929)
 Trichotichnus claripes Lorenz, 1998
 Trichotichnus congruus (Motschulsky, 1866
 Trichotichnus consors (Tschitscherine, 1897)
 Trichotichnus constrictus N.Ito, 2001
 Trichotichnus cordaticollis Schauberger, 1936
 Trichotichnus coruscus (Tschitscherine, 1895)
 Trichotichnus cribripennis (Schauberger, 1935)
 Trichotichnus curticornis N.Ito, 1999
 Trichotichnus curtipennis Schauberger, 1936
 Trichotichnus curtus (Tschitscherine, 1906)
 Trichotichnus curvatus N.Ito, 1996
 Trichotichnus cyanescens N.Ito, 1998
 Trichotichnus cyrtops (Tschitscherine, 1906)
 Trichotichnus daibosatsunis Kasahara, 1991
 Trichotichnus daisenus Habu, 1973
 Trichotichnus davidi (Tschitscherine, 1897)
 Trichotichnus debilistriatus N.Ito, 1997
 Trichotichnus delavayi (Tschitscherine, 1897)
 Trichotichnus delicatus Darlington, 1968
 Trichotichnus demarzi Baehr, 1983
 Trichotichnus denarius Darlington, 1968
 Trichotichnus denticollis Schauberger, 1936
 Trichotichnus depressus N.Ito, 1996
 Trichotichnus dichrous (Dejean, 1829)
 Trichotichnus doiinthanonensis N.Ito, 1997
 Trichotichnus dux Darlington, 1968
 Trichotichnus edai (Jedlicka, 1952)
 Trichotichnus eikoae Morita, 1997
 Trichotichnus ellipticus N.Ito, 2014
 Trichotichnus emarginatibasis N.Ito, 1998
 Trichotichnus emarginatus Andrewes, 1930
 Trichotichnus emeiensis Kataev & N.Ito, 1999
 Trichotichnus fedorenkoi Kataev & N.Ito, 1999
 Trichotichnus flavicollis N.Ito, 2014
 Trichotichnus flavipes (Tschitscherine, 1906)
 Trichotichnus flavomarginatus N.Ito, 2002
 Trichotichnus formosanus Jedlicka, 1949
 Trichotichnus formosus Schauberger, 1935
 Trichotichnus fortis (Darlington, 1968)
 Trichotichnus foveicollis N.Ito, 1998
 Trichotichnus fukiensis Jedlicka, 1956
 Trichotichnus fukuharai Habu, 1957
 Trichotichnus fulgens (Csiki, 1932)
 Trichotichnus fulgidius N.Ito, 1991
 Trichotichnus furihatai Morita, 1997
 Trichotichnus ganeshensis Kataev & J.Schmidt, 2017
 Trichotichnus giganteus (N.Ito, 1991)
 Trichotichnus glabellus Andrewes, 1930
 Trichotichnus glaber (Darlington, 1968)
 Trichotichnus globulipennis Schauberger, 1935
 Trichotichnus gracilis Morita, 1997
 Trichotichnus gracilitibialis N.Ito, 1999
 Trichotichnus gupchiensis Kataev & J.Schmidt, 2017
 Trichotichnus guttula Darlington, 1968
 Trichotichnus hakusanus N.Ito, 2005
 Trichotichnus hanmeii N.Ito, 2009
 Trichotichnus hasensis N.Ito, 2001
 Trichotichnus hayakawai Morita, 1997
 Trichotichnus hayashii N.Ito, 1999
 Trichotichnus hedini Schauberger, 1936
 Trichotichnus hiekei N.Ito, 1997
 Trichotichnus higonis Morita, 1997
 Trichotichnus hingstoni Andrewes, 1930
 Trichotichnus hiranishi Morita, 1997
 Trichotichnus hirasawai Morita, 1997
 Trichotichnus hiroyukii N.Ito, 2007
 Trichotichnus hisakoae Morita, 1997
 Trichotichnus hisamatsui N.Ito, 2009
 Trichotichnus holzschuhi Kirschenhofer, 1992
 Trichotichnus horni Schauberger, 1935
 Trichotichnus hosodai N.Ito, 2005
 Trichotichnus iidesanus N.Ito, 2005
 Trichotichnus imafukui Habu, 1961
 Trichotichnus impunctatoventris N.Ito, 2014
 Trichotichnus impunctus Andrewes, 1947
 Trichotichnus imurai Morita, 1997
 Trichotichnus insignangularis N.Ito, 1999
 Trichotichnus iridulus N.Ito, 2014
 Trichotichnus isabellinus (Louwerens, 1962)
 Trichotichnus isamutanakai N.Ito, 1996
 Trichotichnus ishidai N.Ito, 1996
 Trichotichnus ishiharai N.Ito, 1994
 Trichotichnus ishikawai Kasahara, 1992
 Trichotichnus javanus Andrewes, 1926
 Trichotichnus jedlickai (Schauberger, 1932)
 Trichotichnus jelineki N.Ito, 2009
 Trichotichnus jizuensis N.Ito, 1998
 Trichotichnus kantoonus Habu, 1961
 Trichotichnus kasaharai Habu, 1983
 Trichotichnus kazuyukii N.Ito, 1999
 Trichotichnus kishimotoi Morita, 1997
 Trichotichnus kisonis Kasahara, 1995
 Trichotichnus kitayatsuensus N.Ito, 2011
 Trichotichnus klapperichi (Jedlicka, 1953)
 Trichotichnus knauthi (Ganglbauer, 1901)
 Trichotichnus kobayashie Habu, 1957
 Trichotichnus kosakai Morita, 1997
 Trichotichnus kryzhanovskii Kataev & N.Ito, 1999
 Trichotichnus kurbatovi Kataev & N.Ito, 1999
 Trichotichnus kurosai Habu, 1973
 Trichotichnus ladakhensis Kirschenhofer, 1992
 Trichotichnus laevicollis (Duftschmid, 1812)
 Trichotichnus laevis N.Ito, 1997
 Trichotichnus lamprus (Bates, 1886)
 Trichotichnus langmusiensis N.Ito, 2001
 Trichotichnus latemarginatus N.Ito, 1996
 Trichotichnus laticeps Andrewes, 1930
 Trichotichnus lautus (Andrewes, 1947)
 Trichotichnus leptopus (Bates, 1883)
 Trichotichnus lewisi Schauberger, 1936
 Trichotichnus lindskogi N.Ito, 1996
 Trichotichnus liothorax Schauberger, 1935
 Trichotichnus liparus Andrewes, 1926
 Trichotichnus loebli N.Ito, 1998
 Trichotichnus longitarsis A.Morawitz, 1863
 Trichotichnus lucens (Bates, 1889)
 Trichotichnus luchti Louwerens, 1951
 Trichotichnus lucidus (A.Morawitz, 1863)
 Trichotichnus lulinensis Habu, 1979
 Trichotichnus maculipennis Baehr, 1997
 Trichotichnus malayanus N.Ito, 2001
 Trichotichnus manasluensis Kataev & J.Schmidt, 2017
 Trichotichnus marginalis (Walker, 1859)
 Trichotichnus marginicollis N.Ito, 2014
 Trichotichnus martensi Kataev & J.Schmidt, 2017
 Trichotichnus marubayashiorum N.Ito, 2005
 Trichotichnus mas (Darlington, 1968)
 Trichotichnus masaohayashii N.Ito, 1991
 Trichotichnus masatakayoshidai N.Ito, 2005
 Trichotichnus masumotoi N.Ito, 2011
 Trichotichnus medius Darlington, 1968
 Trichotichnus merkli N.Ito, 2002
 Trichotichnus minor N.Ito, 1998
 Trichotichnus minshanensis N.Ito, 1998
 Trichotichnus minutus Kataev & J.Schmidt, 2017
 Trichotichnus miser Tschitscherine, 1897
 Trichotichnus miwai Jedlicka, 1949
 Trichotichnus mixtus Darlington, 1968
 Trichotichnus miyakei Habu, 1980
 Trichotichnus mizunoi N.Ito, 2005
 Trichotichnus modestus (Tschitscherine, 1906)
 Trichotichnus modus Darlington, 1968
 Trichotichnus mongi Darlington, 1968
 Trichotichnus monticola Kasahara, 1994
 Trichotichnus nanus Habu, 1954
 Trichotichnus narukawai Morita, 1997
 Trichotichnus nenkaoshanensis N.Ito, 1997
 Trichotichnus newtoni Kataev, 2016
 Trichotichnus niger Louwerens, 1951
 Trichotichnus nigricans Schauberger, 1935
 Trichotichnus nigrotibialis N.Ito, 1998
 Trichotichnus nipponicus Habu, 1961
 Trichotichnus nishikawai N.Ito, 2014
 Trichotichnus nishioi Habu, 1961
 Trichotichnus nitens (Heer, 1837)
 Trichotichnus nobuyoae N.Ito, 1999
 Trichotichnus noctuabundus Habu, 1954
 Trichotichnus norikoae N.Ito, 2001
 Trichotichnus notabilangulatus N.Ito, 1998
 Trichotichnus notabilis N.Ito, 1997
 Trichotichnus obliquebasalis Kataev & J.Schmidt, 2017
 Trichotichnus oblongipennis N.Ito, 2002
 Trichotichnus oblongus (Tschitscherine, 1906)
 Trichotichnus obscurus N.Ito, 2002
 Trichotichnus obtusicollis Schauberger, 1936
 Trichotichnus ohkawai Morita, 1997
 Trichotichnus ohkurai N.Ito, 1996
 Trichotichnus okawai Morita, 1997
 Trichotichnus opacus N.Ito, 1998
 Trichotichnus oreas (Bates, 1891)
 Trichotichnus orientalis (Hope, 1845)
 Trichotichnus ovaliformis N.Ito, 1994
 Trichotichnus ovatus N.Ito, 2014
 Trichotichnus pacificatorius Habu, 1954
 Trichotichnus pallescens N.Ito, 2014
 Trichotichnus panchhaseensis Kataev & J.Schmidt, 2017
 Trichotichnus parallelepunctatus Louwerens, 1951
 Trichotichnus parvulus Kataev & J.Schmidt, 2017
 Trichotichnus parvus N.Ito, 2001
 Trichotichnus pauper (Tschitscherine, 1897)
 Trichotichnus persimilis N.Ito, 1996
 Trichotichnus petercatei Kirschenhofer, 1992
 Trichotichnus philippensis (Schauberger, 1933)
 Trichotichnus philippinus (Jedlicka, 1935)
 Trichotichnus piceus N.Ito, 1991
 Trichotichnus pictipennis N.Ito, 2005
 Trichotichnus planicollis N.Ito, 2006
 Trichotichnus potanini (Tschitscherine, 1906)
 Trichotichnus probsti Kirschenhofer, 1992
 Trichotichnus pseudocongruus N.Ito, 2001
 Trichotichnus pseudolucens (Schauberger, 1935)
 Trichotichnus pubescens N.Ito, 2014
 Trichotichnus punctaticollis N.Ito, 1999
 Trichotichnus pusillus Kataev & J.Schmidt, 2017
 Trichotichnus quadratus N.Ito, 2014
 Trichotichnus rasilis (Darlington, 1970)
 Trichotichnus reflexus N.Ito, 2001
 Trichotichnus rimanus Schauberger, 1936
 Trichotichnus robustus N.Ito, 1999
 Trichotichnus rotundatus N.Ito, 2007
 Trichotichnus sakaii N.Ito, 1996
 Trichotichnus saluki Kataev, 2020
 Trichotichnus sasajii N.Ito, 2001
 Trichotichnus sataensis Habu & Nakane, 1955
 Trichotichnus satanensis N.Ito, 2001
 Trichotichnus satoi N.Ito, 1999
 Trichotichnus schaubergeri N.Ito, 1996
 Trichotichnus schawalleri Kataev & J.Schmidt, 2017
 Trichotichnus sedlaceki (Darlington, 1968)
 Trichotichnus semimas Darlington, 1968
 Trichotichnus semirugosus Darlington, 1968
 Trichotichnus septemtrionalis (Habu, 1947)
 Trichotichnus seramensis N.Ito, 1998
 Trichotichnus setifer Kataev & N.Ito, 1999
 Trichotichnus shibatai Habu, 1973
 Trichotichnus shikokuensis Kasahara & Y.Ito, 1995
 Trichotichnus shiragayamanus N.Ito, 2011
 Trichotichnus sikkimensis Kataev & J.Schmidt, 2017
 Trichotichnus siklesensis Kataev & J.Schmidt, 2017
 Trichotichnus silvestris Morita, 1997
 Trichotichnus smetanai Kataev & N.Ito, 1999
 Trichotichnus spinifer Kasahara, 1994
 Trichotichnus storeyi Baehr, 1990
 Trichotichnus straneoi (Louwerens, 1962)
 Trichotichnus subaeneus N.Ito, 1997
 Trichotichnus subcordicollis N.Ito, 1997
 Trichotichnus subiridis N.Ito, 2000
 Trichotichnus subreticulatus N.Ito, 2006
 Trichotichnus sugimotoi Habu, 1975
 Trichotichnus sumatrensis Andrewes, 1926
 Trichotichnus suzukii N.Ito, 2014
 Trichotichnus szekessyi (Jedlicka, 1954)
 Trichotichnus taichii Kataev & N.Ito, 1999
 Trichotichnus taiwanus Habu, 1975
 Trichotichnus tenuitibialis N.Ito, 2009
 Trichotichnus teradai Habu, 1980
 Trichotichnus tolgae Baehr, 1990
 Trichotichnus tonklii Kirschenhofer, 1992
 Trichotichnus tranquillus Habu, 1954
 Trichotichnus trapezicollis N.Ito, 1997
 Trichotichnus triangulatus N.Ito, 2006
 Trichotichnus trusmadiensis N.Ito, 2008
 Trichotichnus tschitscherini Schauberger, 1936
 Trichotichnus tsurugiyamanus Habu, 1959
 Trichotichnus uedai Morita, 2016
 Trichotichnus uenoi Habu, 1969
 Trichotichnus uenorum Kasahara & N.Ito, 1995
 Trichotichnus vespertinus Habu, 1954
 Trichotichnus vicinus (Tschitscherine, 1897)
 Trichotichnus vietnamensis N.Ito, 2009
 Trichotichnus vulgaris (Tschitscherine, 1906)
 Trichotichnus vulpeculus (Say, 1823)
 Trichotichnus wansuiensis Habu, 1979
 Trichotichnus watamukiensis N.Ito, 1996
 Trichotichnus watanabei N.Ito, 2002
 Trichotichnus wau (Darlington, 1968)
 Trichotichnus yasuhikoi N.Ito, 2014
 Trichotichnus yatsuensis Morita, 1997
 Trichotichnus yokoyamai N.Ito, 2006
 Trichotichnus yoriomiyatakei N.Ito, 1998
 Trichotichnus yoshihiroi Morita, 1997
 Trichotichnus yoshiroi Morita, 1997
 Trichotichnus yoshiyukii N.Ito, 2005
 Trichotichnus yukihikoi Habu, 1961
 Trichotichnus yukii N.Ito, 2005
 Trichotichnus yunnanus (Fairmaire, 1887)
 Trichotichnus yushanensis Habu, 1979
 Trichotichnus zabriformis Schauberger, 1936

References

Harpalinae